Louise Parker (born 10 December 1942) is a Canadian gymnast. She competed in five events at the 1960 Summer Olympics.

References

1942 births
Living people
Canadian female artistic gymnasts
Olympic gymnasts of Canada
Gymnasts at the 1960 Summer Olympics
Gymnasts from Montreal
Pan American Games medalists in gymnastics
Pan American Games silver medalists for Canada
Pan American Games bronze medalists for Canada
Gymnasts at the 1959 Pan American Games
Medalists at the 1959 Pan American Games
20th-century Canadian women
21st-century Canadian women